The Dikgatlong Local Municipality municipal council consists of fifteen members elected by mixed-member proportional representation. Eight councillors are elected by first-past-the-post voting in eight wards, while the remaining seven are chosen from party lists so that the total number of party representatives is proportional to the number of votes received.

In the election of 3 August 2016 the African National Congress (ANC) won a majority of nine seats on the council. In the election of 1 November 2021 the African National Congress (ANC) won a reduced majority of eight seats on the council.

Results
The following table shows the composition of the council after past elections.

December 2000 election

The following table shows the results of the 2000 election.

March 2006 election

The following table shows the results of the 2006 election.

May 2011 election

The following table shows the results of the 2011 election.

August 2016 election

The following table shows the results of the 2016 election.

November 2021 election

The following table shows the results of the 2021 election.

By-elections from November 2021
The following by-elections were held to fill vacant ward seats in the period from November 2021. In ward 6, the ANC candidate died in a car accident. In the subsequent by-election, the ANC candidate retained the ward for the party with an increased share of the vote.

References

Dikgatlong
Elections in the Northern Cape
Frances Baard District Municipality